William Foster (1842 – 1909) was an architect in Iowa.

Together with Henry F. Liebbe (1851-1927), he worked as Foster & Liebbe, which designed numerous courthouses and other public buildings.

A number of his works are listed on the U.S. National Register of Historic Places.

Works include (with attribution):
Blair House, E. Washington St. and S. 2nd Ave., Washington, Iowa (Foster, William), NRHP-listed
Hawkeye Insurance Company Building, 209 Fourth St., Des Moines, Iowa (Foster, William), NRHP-listed
E.R. Hays House, 301 N. 2nd St., Knoxville, Iowa (Foster, William), NRHP-listed
Iowa Men's Reformatory Historic District, N. High St., Anamosa, Iowa (Foster, William), NRHP-listed
Naylor House, 944 W. 9th St., Des Moines, Iowa (Foster, William), NRHP-listed
Page County Courthouse, Main St., Clarinda, Iowa (Foster, William), NRHP-listed
Parker's Opera House, 23 N. Federal Ave., Mason City, Iowa (Foster, William), NRHP-listed
Youngerman Block, 206-208 4th St., Des Moines, Iowa (Foster, William), NRHP-listed
English Office Building for Iowa State College, Ames, Iowa
Lucas County Courthouse, Chariton, Iowa
Central School, Lake City, Iowa (Foster & Liebee), NRHP-listed
Cathedral Church of Saint Paul, 815 High St., Des Moines, Iowa (Foster and Liebbe), NRHP-listed
Central Christian Church, Des Moines, Iowa (Foster & Liebbe)
Herndon Hall, 2000 Grand Ave., Des Moines, Iowa (Foster & Liebbe), NRHP-listed
Hospital for the Insane, Clarinda, Iowa (Foster & Liebbe)
Iowa County Courthouse, Court Ave., Marengo, Iowa (Foster & Liebbe), NRHP-listed
Wapello County Courthouse, Court St., Ottumwa, Iowa (Foster & Liebbe), NRHP-listed
Washington County Courthouse, N. B Ave., Washington, Iowa (Foster & Liebbe), NRHP-listed
One or more buildings in the Grinnell Historic Commercial District, Grinnell, Iowa (Foster & Liebbe), NRHP-listed
One or more works in the Winterset Courthouse Square Commercial Historic District, Winterset, Iowa (William Foster), NRHP-listed

See also
William Dewey Foster, architect of post offices and government buildings

References

19th-century American architects
Architects from Iowa
1842 births
1909 deaths